The IBM System/370 Model 145 was announced September 23, 1970, three months after the 155 and 165 models.  It was the fourth member of the IBM System/370 line of computers, and was the first IBM computer to use semiconductor memory for its main memory instead of magnetic core memory. It was described as being five times faster than the IBM System/360 Model 40. First shipments were scheduled for late summer of 1971.

New capabilities
The System/370's basic architecture was described as having been an extension, but not a redesign, from that of IBM's 1964-introduced System/360.

The 370 introduced some new instructions, such as 
 MOVE CHARACTER LONG (MVCL) and
 COMPARE CHARACTER LONG (CLCL), 
thereby permitting operations on up to 224-1 bytes (16 MB), vs. the 256-byte limits on the 360's MVC and CLC, but lacked a DAT (Dynamic Address Translation) box.

Virtual memory
Some said about the early members of the IBM System/370 family, looking back, that they were not "the real 370 line" because "neither offered virtual storage capability, which was to be a hallmark of the 370 line."

Unlike the earlier Model 155 and 165 systems, for which an upgrade to virtual memory required the purchase of an expensive upgrade to add a DAT box, the 145's customers had two advantages:
  370/145 customers did not have to wait as long for this lack of virtual memory to be remedied
  there was no need to buy extra hardware: An upgrade to the 145's microcode through a new microcode floppy disk enabled virtual memory capability.

VM/CMS
Upon gaining virtual memory capability via a microcode update, the 145 could now support the VMF (Virtual Machine Facility) and VM/CMS, a time-sharing system.

See also
 List of IBM products
 IBM System/360
 IBM System/370

Notes

References

IBM System/360 mainframe line
Computer-related introductions in 1970